Blackstone  may refer to:

People
 Charles Blackstone (born 1977), fiction writer
 Elliott Blackstone (1924–2006), former police sergeant and LGBT advocate
 Gay Blackstone (born 1952), widow of Harry Blackstone, Jr.
 Harriet Blackstone (1864–1939), American painter
 Harry Blackstone Sr. (1885–1965), famous American magician known as "The Great Blackstone" and father of Harry Blackstone, Jr.
 Harry Blackstone Jr. (1934–1997), popular stage magician and television performer of the late 20th century
 Ian Blackstone (born 1964), English former footballer
 Jerry Blackstone, director of choirs at the University of Michigan
 John Wilford Blackstone Sr. (1796–1868), American lawyer and legislator
 John Wilford Blackstone Jr. (1835–1911), American lawyer and legislator
 Milton Blackstone (1906–1983), publicity agent for Eddie Fisher 
 Tessa Blackstone, Baroness Blackstone (born 1942), British politician
 Timothy Blackstone (1829–1900), Chicago Railroad and Stock Yard president
 Sir William Blackstone (1723–1780), English jurist
 Blackstone's formulation, a principle in criminal law named for the jurist
 The Commentaries on the Laws of England by William Blackstone, a 1769 major legal text of the 18th century; often referred to as "Blackstone" or "Blackstone's Commentaries
 William Eugene Blackstone (1841–1935), American evangelist and Christian Zionist
 William Seymour Blackstone (1809–1881), 19th-century British MP and grandson of William Blackstone the jurist, above
 William Blackstone, aka William Blaxton (1595–1675), early English settler in New England

Businesses
 Blackstone & Co, a diesel engine and agricultural engineering company in Stamford, Lincolnshire, which became Mirrlees Blackstone
 Blackstone Audio, publisher of audiobooks
 Blackstone Career Institute, online training institute
 Blackstone Chambers, a set of barristers' chambers in London
 Blackstone Legal Fellowship, legal training and internship program
Black Stone Minerals, a Houston, Texas-based oil and natural gas corporation
 Blackstone Press, a subsidiary of OUP
 Blackstone Winery, a Gonzales, California winery owned by Constellation Brands
 Blackstone Inc, U.S. private equity, investment banking, and asset management firm
 Blackstones Bar Maine's longest operating LGBTQ bar, and currently Portland's only LGBTQ bar.

Places

Australia 
Blackstone, Queensland, a suburb in the City of Ipswich
Blackstone, Western Australia, known as Papulankutja
Blackstone Heights, Tasmania

United Kingdom 
Blackstone Edge, an area of moorland along the Lancashire (Greater Manchester) and West Yorkshire county boundary in England
Blackstone, West Sussex, England

United States 
Blackstone, Illinois
Blackstone, Massachusetts
Blackstone, Pennsylvania
Blackstone, Providence, Rhode Island, a neighborhood
Blackstone Boulevard Park, in Providence, Rhode Island
Blackstone Park Conservation District, in Providence, Rhode Island
Blackstone Park Historic District, in Providence, Rhode Island
Blackstone, Virginia
Blackstone Army Airfield, Virginia
The Blackstone River in Massachusetts and Rhode Island
The Blackstone Valley, a National Heritage Corridor along the Blackstone River
Blackstone River Bikeway, a planned rail trail
Blackstone Valley Regional Vocational Technical High School, Upton, Massachusetts

Canada
Blackstone Lake, Ontario

Fiction
Blackstone (novel), a 1972 novel featuring the character Edmund 'Beau' Blackstone, a fictional 19th century detective created by "Richard Falkirk" (Derek Lambert); the first of six such novels
Blackstone Chronicles, a series of mystery and thriller novels authored by John Saul
Blackstone Fortress, a type of space station in the fictional universe of Warhammer 40,000
Blackstone (TV series), the fictional Blackstone First Nation's struggles with corruption, politics, and the need for change
Blackstone, the Magic Detective, a radio series starring a fictionalized version of Harry Blackstone, Sr.
 The Blackstone, a country club in the TV series Royal Pains

Other
Black Stone, a Muslim object of reverence
Blackstone Avenue, a major roadway in Fresno, California, USA
Blackstone Hall, a dormitory at the University of Chicago
The Blackstone Hotel, a Chicago hotel
Blackstone Hotel (Omaha, Nebraska), a 1915 Omaha landmark currently known as the Blackstone Center
Blackstone Library, Chicago's first public library
Blackstone Memorial, a Zionist petition written by William Eugene Blackstone
Blackstone, a codename for ColdFusion 7.0 - beta of ColdFusion MX 7.0, a product of Macromedia
Blackstone, in reference to the Black P. Stones gang
HTC BlackStone, a Windows Mobile phone also known as the HTC Touch HD
Operation Blackstone, part of Operation Torch, the Allied landings in Africa during World War II

See also
Black Stone (disambiguation)
Blackstones (disambiguation)
Blackstone River (disambiguation)
Black Rock (disambiguation)
William J. Blakistone (died 1882), American politician and lawyer